Monaco sent a team of sportsmen and women to compete at the 2008 Summer Olympics in Beijing, People's Republic of China.

Athletics

Men

Judo

Rowing 

Men

Qualification Legend: FA=Final A (medal); FB=Final B (non-medal); FC=Final C (non-medal); FD=Final D (non-medal); FE=Final E (non-medal); FF=Final F (non-medal); SA/B=Semifinals A/B; SC/D=Semifinals C/D; SE/F=Semifinals E/F; QF=Quarterfinals; R=Repechage

Shooting 

Women

Weightlifting 

Nations at the 2008 Summer Olympics
2008 Summer Olympics
Summer Olympics